Vitrinidae is a family of small, air-breathing land snails, terrestrial pulmonate gastropod mollusks in the superfamily Limacoidea (according to the taxonomy of the Gastropoda by Bouchet & Rocroi, 2005).

Distribution 
The distribution of the Vitrinidae includes the Nearctic, western Palearctic, eastern Palearctic, and Ethiopian zones, as well as Hawaii.

Anatomy
Snails in this family make and use love darts made of chitin.

In this family, the number of haploid chromosomes lies between 26 and 35 (according to the values in this table).

Genera 
Genera in the family Vitrinidae include:
 † Planellavitrina Margry, 2018 
 † Provitrina Wenz, 1919 
 Subfamily Plutoniinae T. Cockerell, 1893
 Arabivitrina Thiele, 1931
 Azorivitrina Giusti, Fiorentino, Benocci & Manganelli, 2011
 Calidivitrina Pilsbry, 1919
 Canarivitrina Valido & M. R. Alonso, 2000
 Guerrina Odhner, 1954
 Insulivitrina P. Hesse, 1923
 Madeirovitrina Groh & Hemmen, 1986
 Megavitrina Bank, Menkhorst & Neubert, 2016
 Phenacolimax Stabile, 1859
 Plutonia Morelet, 1864
 Sanettivitrina Pfarrer, Rowson, Tattersfield & Neubert, 2021
 Sardovitrina Manganelli & Giusti, 2005
 Subfamily Vitrininae Fitzinger, 1833
 Eucobresia  H. B. Baker, 1929
 Hessemilimax Schileyko, 1986
 Oligolimax P. Fischer, 1878
 Semilimacella Soós, 1917
 Semilimax Gray, 1847
 Vitrina Draparnaud, 1801
 Vitrinobrachium Künkel, 1929
Synonyms
 Balcanovitrina Ošanova & L. Pintér, 1968: synonym of Semilimacella Soós, 1917
 Chlamydea Westerlund, 1886: synonym of Semilimax Gray, 1847
 Cobresia Hübner, 1810: synonym of Vitrina Draparnaud, 1801
 Gallandia Bourguignat, 1880: synonym of Oligolimax P. Fischer, 1878
 Helicolimax J. Férussac, 1807: synonym of Vitrina Draparnaud, 1801
 Hyalina S. Studer, 1820: synonym of Vitrina Draparnaud, 1801 (non Schumacher, 1817)
 Pagana Gistel, 1848: synonym of Vitrina Draparnaud, 1801
 Targionia P. Hesse, 1923: synonym of Semilimacella Soós, 1917
 Tozzettia P. Hesse, 1924: synonym of Semilimacella Soós, 1917
 Trochovitrina O. Boettger, 1880: synonym of Oligolimax P. Fischer, 1878 (junior synonym)
 Vitrinopugio Ihering, 1892: synonym of Semilimax Gray, 1847 (unavailable; objective junior synonym)
 Vitriplutonia Collinge, 1893: synonym of Plutonia Morelet, 1864

Cladogram 
A cladogram showing the phylogenic relationships of this family to other families within the limacoid clade:

References

 Schileyko, A. A. (1986). Sistema i filogeniya Vitrinidae (Gastropoda Pulmonata). In: Y. I. Starobogatov & Schileyko, A. A. (eds.), Morfologicheskie i ekologicheskie osnovy sistematiki molljuskov. Trudy Zoologicheskogo Instituta Akademii Nauk SSSR. 148: 124-157. Leningrad

External links 
 Fitzinger, L.J. (1833). Systematisches Verzeichniß der im Erzherzogthume Oesterreich vorkommenden Weichthiere, als Prodrom einer Fauna derselben. Beiträge zur Landeskunde Oesterreichs's unter der Enns, 3: 88-122. Wien
 Pfarrer, B., Rowson, B., Tattersfield, P. & Neubert, E. (2021). Phylogenetic position of African Vitrinidae: Old family groups unraveled. Journal of Zoological Systematics and Evolutionary Research. 2021: 1–19.